

Rolf-Dieter Müller (born 9 December 1948) is a German military historian and political scientist, who has served as Scientific Director of the German Armed Forces Military History Research Office since 1999. Rolf-Dieter Müller is also a former professor of military history at Humboldt University.

Müller, in cooperation with German journalist Rudibert Kunz, is known for being the first historian to write about the use of chemical weapons in the Rif War in a 1999 book titled Giftgas Gegen Abd El Krim: Deutschland, Spanien und der Gaskrieg in Spanisch-Marokko, 1922-1927.

Müller was one of the lead researchers on the seminal work Germany and the Second World War.

Works

In English
Germany and the Second World War (contributor)
 Hitler's War in the East 1941−1945: A Critical Assessment (1997)
The Unknown Eastern Front: The Wehrmacht and Hitler's Foreign Soldiers
Hitler's Wehrmacht 1935-1945 
Enemy in the East: Hitler's Secret Plans to Invade the Soviet Union

In German

References and notes

1948 births
Living people
20th-century German historians
Rif War
German male non-fiction writers